HD 141399 is a K-type main-sequence star 121 light-years away in the constellation of Boötes. Its surface temperature is 5602 K. HD 141399 is enriched in heavy elements compared to the Sun, with a metallicity Fe/H index of 0.36. Its age is unknown. The star has very low starspot activity.

Planetary system
In 2014, four planets orbiting HD 141399 were discovered by the radial velocity method. Planet HD 141399c is possibly located within the habitable zone. The planetary orbits are close to high-order mean-motion resonance and closely conform to Titius–Bode law. Two additional planets, one with a period of 462.9 days, are suspected by analogy with the orbits of the Solar System planets. The planetary orbits around HD 141399 are expected to "jump" periodically on a timescale of a few million years between several quasi-stable configurations due to planet-planet interactions.

References

Boötes
K-type main-sequence stars
Planetary systems with four confirmed planets
J15465382+4659105
077301
BD+47 2267
141399